, also written as "魹ヶ崎" is the easternmost point of the island of Honshu in Japan. It is located within the borders of the city of Miyako, Iwate, and is part of the Sanriku Fukkō National Park. Although referred to as a “cape”, the area is not clearly a peninsula extending into the Pacific Ocean, but is simply the easternmost point on a coastline.

External links

Miyako City travel Information
Japan National Tourism Organisation (JMTO) site 

Miyako, Iwate
Landforms of Iwate Prefecture
Tourist attractions in Iwate Prefecture
Todo
Extreme points of Japan